"Leech"  is the 14th maxi-single by the Japanese rock band, the Gazette. It was released on November 12, 2008 in two editions; the "Optical Impression" edition, "Auditory Impression" edition. The first includes the songs "Leech" and "Distorted Daytime"- it also includes a DVD containing the music video for the song "Leech". The second comes with a bonus track, "Hole".

Track listing

Leech: Optical Impression-
Disk one
 "Leech" - 4:13
 "Distorted Daytime" - 3:52
Disc two (DVD)
 "Leech: Music Clip" – 4:31

Leech: Auditory Impression
 "Leech" - 4:13
 "Distorted daytime" - 3:52
 "Hole" – 3:13

Note
 The single reached a peak mark of #2 on the Japanese Oricon Weekly Charts.

References

2008 singles
The Gazette (band) songs
2008 songs
King Records (Japan) singles